Meginhard I (c. 1085-c. 1135) was a member of the House of Sponheim, succeeding his father, Stephan II, Count of Sponheim. His mother was probably Sophia of Formbach.

References 
E. Hlawitschka, 'Die 'Verwandtenehe' des Gegenkönigs Hermann von Salm und seiner Frau Sophie. Ein Beitrag zu den Familienbeziehungen der rheinischen Ezzonen/Hezeliniden und des Grafenhauses von Formbach/Vormbach,' in Festschrift für Andreas Kraus zum 80. Geburtstag. Schriftenreihe zur bayerischen Landesgeschichte, Band 140, (Verlag C.H. Beck München 2002).
 J. Mötsch, ‘Genealogie der Grafen von Sponheim,’ Jahrbuch für westdeutsche Landesgeschichte 13 (1987), 63-179.

Notes

1080s births
1130s deaths
House of Sponheim
Year of birth uncertain

Year of death uncertain